Lal Masjid ( "Red Mosque") of Delhi, also known as the Fakr-ul Masjid ( "Pride of Mosques") or Sikandar Sahib's Masjid, is a mosque located in Bara Bazaar, Kashmiri Gate in Old Delhi, India.

History 
The building was built in 1728 by Kaniz-i-Fatima (entitled Fakr-i-Jahan), in memory of her husband Shujaat Khan, a noble in the court of Mughal emperor Aurangzeb. Colonel James Skinner repaired the mosque and its construction is sometimes misattributed to him.

Illustrations and descriptions of the mosque were included in Sir Thomas Metcalfe's 1844 book "Reminiscences of Imperial Delhi." 

In the 1857 Siege of Delhi the mosque was damaged, yet since then, has been repaired.

Architecture 
The main complex consists of three rooms each with its own arched entryway. Two striped towers on either side of the center arch are mirrored by the mosque's two minarets standing at the rear corners of building. Behind a decorated parapet on the roof of the mosque sit three white and black marble domes. The building's prominent use of red sandstone and white marble is considered unusual for the period, though many of its other features, including its minarets and domes, are closely modeled off of the major mosques of Delhi including the nearby Jama Masjid.

References

Mosques in Delhi
Religious buildings and structures completed in 1729